First Bus can mean:

New World First Bus, third largest bus operator in Hong Kong
FirstBus, a United Kingdom bus company that was renamed FirstGroup in 1998